Rosamund Mary Greenwood (12 June 1907 – 15 July 1997) was a British actress who was active on screen from 1935 until 1990.

Biography
After training at London's Central School, she was on stage from the late 1920s. Her theatre work included starring in the original West End and Broadway productions of Thornton Wilder's The Matchmaker in 1954-1957.

In a career stretching 60 years, Greenwood's screen work included The Prince and the Showgirl, Night of the Demon, Upstairs, Downstairs, All Creatures Great and Small, Angels, Crown Court and A Perfect Spy, and Hallelujah! in 1983. Her final role, at the age of 83, came in 1990 when she played a witch in the screen adaptation of Roald Dahl's novel The Witches.

She died in July 1997, a month after her 90th birthday.

Filmography

References

External links

1907 births
1997 deaths
English stage actresses
English film actresses
English television actresses
Actresses from Leeds
20th-century English actresses
Alumni of the Royal Central School of Speech and Drama